Ooh Las Vegas is a compilation album by the Scottish rock band Deacon Blue. It contains B-sides, unreleased tracks, and songs written for William McIlvanney's television play Dreaming.

The Japanese release also included the four tracks from the Four Bacharach & David Songs EP.

Track listing 
All songs written by Ricky Ross, except where noted:

  "Disneyworld [Remix]" – 2:49
  "Ronnie Spector" (Ross, Kelling, Prime) – 3:29
  "My America" (Ross, Prime) – 3:10
  "S.H.A.R.O.N." – 4:13
  "Undeveloped Heart" (Ross, Prime) – 4:59
  "Souvenirs" – 2:41
  "Born Again" (Hayes, Porter) – 3:23
  "Down in the Flood" (Ross, Prime, Deacon Blue) – 4:33
  "Back Here in Beanoland" – 3:01
  "Love You Say" (Ross, McIlvanney) – 5:34
  "Let Your Hearts Be Troubled" (Ross, McIlvanney) – 6:31
  "Gentle Teardrops" – 3:13
  "Little Lincoln" – 3:06
  "That Country (Beneath Your Skin)" – 3:50
  "Is It Cold Beneath the Hill?" (McIntosh, Prime, McIlvanney) – 3:57
  "Circus Lights (Acoustic Version)" – 2:56
  "Trampolene" (Cope) – 3:36
  "Las Vegas" – 3:55
  "Killing the Blues" (McIlvanney, Ross) – 3:49
  "Long Window to Love" – 3:12
  "Christine" – 2:26
  "Take Me to the Place" (Ross, traditional arr.) – 2:26
  "Don't Let the Teardrops Start" – 3:01

Personnel
Ricky Ross – vocals, guitar, piano, keyboards
Lorraine McIntosh – vocals
James Prime – keyboards
Ewen Vernal – bass
Graeme Kelling – guitar
Dougie Vipond – drums

References

Deacon Blue albums
1990 compilation albums
Columbia Records compilation albums